Manuel Nieto may refer to:
Manuel Nieto (soldier) (1734–1804), Mexican soldier
Manuel Nieto (footballer) (born 1998), Spanish footballer